Rear-Admiral Alexander Bruce Richardson,  (born September 1941) is a former Royal Navy officer who served as Flag Officer Sea Training from 1989 to 1991.

Naval career
Richardson joined the Royal Navy in 1960. He became naval attaché in Moscow in 1982, commanding officer of the frigate  and commander of the 4th Frigate Squadron in September 1983 and Flag Officer Sea Training in December 1989. He went on to be Flag Officer, Surface Flotilla in September 1991 before retiring in April 1992.

Richardson was appointed a Companion of the Order of the Bath in the 1992 Birthday Honours.

Later life
In retirement Richardson became chief harbourmaster for the Port of London Authority.

References

1941 births
Companions of the Order of the Bath
Living people
Royal Navy rear admirals